Eugenio Sánchez may refer to:
 Junior Sanchez (Eugenio Sanchez Jr.), American record producer
 Eugenio Sánchez (cyclist), Spanish cyclist